Jan Randles (born 23 August 1945)  is a Paralympic athletics competitor from Australia who competed in the 1984 New York/Stoke Mandeville Paralympics and won two medals - gold and bronze. She was the first female Australian Paralympian to win a Paralympic Games marathon. The next woman win a Paralympic marathon was Madison de Rozario at the 2020 Summer Paralympics.

Personal

Randles was born on 23 August 1945 in Melbourne. In 1974 whilst holidaying in Bali, she fell off a motorbike and broke her back.

Sporting career 

Randles was classified "4" athlete in the Women's Marathon, 5000 m, 1500 m and 800 m. She won two medals: a gold medal in the Women's Marathon 4 event and a bronze in the Women's 5000 m 4 event.

References

Paralympic athletes of Australia
Athletes (track and field) at the 1984 Summer Paralympics
Paralympic gold medalists for Australia
Paralympic bronze medalists for Australia
Living people
Medalists at the 1984 Summer Paralympics
Paralympic medalists in athletics (track and field)
Australian female wheelchair racers
1945 births